UFC 126: Silva vs. Belfort was a mixed martial arts pay-per-view event held by the Ultimate Fighting Championship on February 5, 2011, at the Mandalay Bay Events Center in Las Vegas, Nevada.

Background
Former Light Heavyweight Champion Vitor Belfort was scheduled to fight Yushin Okami at UFC 122. However, UFC President Dana White said that Belfort would instead challenge Middleweight Champion Anderson Silva for the belt. Belfort was originally scheduled to compete against Silva on January 2, 2010, at UFC 108, but due to an injury sustained by Silva, the fight had to be postponed until February 6, 2010, at UFC 109 and April 10, 2010, at UFC 112, respectively. However, both fights were cancelled.

A bout between Kenny Florian and Evan Dunham was expected for this event. The fight was moved to UFC: Fight For The Troops 2.

A bout between Jon Fitch and Jake Ellenberger was expected for this event. However Fitch was pulled from the bout and instead fought former two-division champion B.J. Penn at UFC 127. Ellenberger remained on the card and instead fought Carlos Eduardo Rocha.

Sam Stout was originally scheduled to face Paul Kelly at this event, but dropped off of the card due to injury. Donald Cerrone stepped in to replace him, in what would become the first UFC lightweight fight featuring a fighter imported from the World Extreme Cagefighting following their merger in December 2010.

UFC 126 featured two preliminary fights live on Spike TV, and one preliminary fight on their Facebook stream.

Results

Bonus awards
Fighters were awarded $75,000 bonuses.

Fight of the Night: Donald Cerrone vs. Paul Kelly
Knockout of the Night: Anderson Silva
Submission of the Night: Jon Jones

Reported payout
The following is the reported payout to the fighters as reported to the Nevada State Athletic Commission. The numbers only include figures that UFC disclosed to the athletic commission; fight bonuses, sponsorship fees, and other unofficial bonuses were not disclosed.

Anderson Silva: $200,000 (includes no win bonus) def. Vitor Belfort: $275,000
Forrest Griffin: $275,000 ($150,000 win bonus) def. Rich Franklin: $75,000
Jon Jones: $140,000 ($70,000 win bonus) def. Ryan Bader: $20,000
Jake Ellenberger: $32,000 ($16,000 win bonus) def. Carlos Eduardo Rocha: $8,000
Miguel Torres: $56,000 ($28,000 win bonus) def. Antonio Banuelos: $9,000
Donald Cerrone: $36,000 ($18,000 win bonus) def. Paul Kelly: $19,000
Chad Mendes: $19,000 ($9,500 win bonus) def. Michihiro Omigawa: $8,000
Demetrious Johnson: $10,000 ($5,000 win bonus) def. Norifumi Yamamoto: $15,000
Paul Taylor: $36,000 ($18,000 win bonus) def. Gabe Ruediger: $8,000
Kyle Kingsbury: $20,000 ($10,000 win bonus) def. Ricardo Romero: $10,000
Mike Pierce: $28,000 ($14,000 win bonus) def. Kenny Robertson: $6,000

See also
List of UFC events
List of male mixed martial artists

References

External links
 Official UFC past events page
 UFC events results at Sherdog.com

Ultimate Fighting Championship events
2011 in mixed martial arts
Mixed martial arts in Las Vegas
2011 in sports in Nevada